Saintala is a taluk located at about  south of the Balangir-Titlagarh road in Titlagarh sub-division of Bolangir district, Odisha, India. It was formerly known as Sainyatala.

National Highway 201 passes through Saintala.

Geography

Saintala is located on the southern plateau, surrounded by evergreen forests, hills, rivers and farmlands.

Saintala is well connected with both roadways and railways. National Highway 201 passes through it and also other roads connects it with nearby villages.

References

External links
 About Saintala

Villages in Bolangir district